The Cycling Events will be held from 9 December to 14 December 2009 with 8 gold medals up for contention.

Medal table

Medalists

Road cycling

Mountain biking

Results

Road Cycling

Men

50 Km. Individual Time Trial
December 13
Location : That Luang – Lan Xang Avenue – Samsenethai – Thadeua 10KM-T 4

160.3 Km. Massed Start 
December 14
Location : Done Noune Tri Square, Ban Keun and return at Thalath
Distance : 156.6 km.

Women

25 Km. Individual Time Trial
December 13
Location : That Luang – Lan Xang Avenue – Samsenethai – Thadeua 10KM-T 4

116.1 Km. Massed Start 
December 14
Location : Dane Soung, Saythany District
Distance : 120 km.

Mountain biking

Men

Down Hill
December 9 - Seeding Run
December 10 - Final
 Location : Dane Soung, Saythany District.

Cross Country
December 11
Venue :Tad Song, Saythany District.  	   	 
Distance : 49.7 km.

Women

Down Hill
December 9 - Seeding Run
December 10 - Final
 Location : Dane Soung, Saythany District.

Cross Country
December 11
Venue :Tad Song, Saythany District.  	   	 
Distance : 28.4 km.

External links
Southeast Asian Games Official Results

2009 Southeast Asian Games events
2009 in cycle racing
2009
2009 in road cycling
2009 in mountain biking